In statistics, machine learning and algorithms, a tensor sketch is a type of dimensionality reduction that is particularly efficient when applied to vectors that have tensor structure. Such a sketch can be used to speed up explicit kernel methods, bilinear pooling in neural networks and is a cornerstone in many numerical linear algebra algorithms.

Mathematical definition
Mathematically, a dimensionality reduction or sketching matrix is a matrix , where , such that for any vector 

with high probability.
In other words,  preserves the norm of vectors up to a small error.

A tensor sketch has the extra property that if  for some vectors  such that , the transformation  can be computed more efficiently. Here  denotes the Kronecker product, rather than the outer product, though the two are related by a flattening.

The speedup is achieved by first rewriting , where  denotes the elementwise (Hadamard) product.
In most use cases this method is significantly faster than the full  requiring  time.

History

The term tensor sketch was coined in 2013 describing a technique by Rasmus Pagh from the same year.
Originally it was understood using the fast Fourier transform to do fast convolution of count sketches.
Later research works generalized it to a much larger class of dimensionality reductions via Tensor random embeddings.

Tensor random embeddings were introduced in 2010 in a paper on differential privacy and were first analyzed by Rudelson et al. in 2012 in the context of sparse recovery.

Avron et al.
were the first to study the subspace embedding properties of tensor sketches, particularly focused on applications to polynomial kernels.
In this context, the sketch is required not only to preserve the norm of each individual vector with a certain probability but to preserve the norm of all vectors in each individual linear subspace.
This is a much stronger property, and it requires larger sketch sizes, but it allows the kernel methods to be used very broadly as explored in the book by David Woodruff.

Tensor random projections
The face-splitting product is defined as the tensor products of the rows (was proposed by V. Slyusar in 1996 for radar and digital antenna array applications).
More directly, let  and  be two matrices.
Then the face-splitting product  is

The reason this product is useful is the following identity:

where  is the element-wise (Hadamard) product.
Since this operation can be computed in linear time,  can be multiplied on vectors with tensor structure much faster than normal matrices.

Construction with fast Fourier transform

The tensor sketch of Pham and Pagh computes
They show that, amazingly, this equals  – a count sketch of the tensor product!

It turns out that this relation can be seen in terms of the face-splitting product as
, where  is the Fourier transform matrix.
What's left is that .

On the other hand,
.

Application to general matrices

The problem with the original tensor sketch algorithm was that it used count sketch matrices, which aren't always very good dimensionality reductions.

In 2020 it was shown that any matrices with random enough independent rows suffice to create a tensor sketch.
This allows using matrices with stronger guarantees, such as real Gaussian Johnson Lindenstrauss matrices.

In particular, we get the following theorem

 Then  with probability  for any vector  if 
.

Variations

Recursive construction

.

With this method, we only apply the general tensor sketch method to order 2 tensors, which avoids the exponential dependency in the number of rows.

It can be proved that combining  dimensionality reductions like this only increases  by a factor .

Fast constructions

The fast Johnson–Lindenstrauss transform is a dimensionality reduction matrix

Given a matrix , computing the matrix vector product  takes  time.
The Fast Johnson Lindenstrauss Transform (FJLT), was introduced by Ailon and Chazelle in 2006.

A version of this method takes

where
  is a diagonal matrix where each diagonal entry  is  independently.
The matrix-vector multiplication  can be computed in  time.
  is a Hadamard matrix, which allows matrix-vector multiplication in time 
  is a  sampling matrix which is all zeros, except a single 1 in each row.

If the diagonal matrix is replaced by one which has a tensor product of  values on the diagonal, instead of being fully independent, it is possible to compute  fast.

We can then split up  as follows:

The same approach can be extended to compute higher degree products, such as 

Ahle et al. shows that if  has  rows, then  for any vector  with probability , while allowing fast multiplication with degree  tensors.

Jin et al., the same year, showed a similar result for the more general class of matrices call RIP, which includes the subsampled Hadamard matrices.
In the case  this matches the previous result.

These fast constructions can again be combined with the recursion approach mentioned above, giving the fastest overall tensor sketch.

Data aware sketching
It is also possible to do so-called "data aware" tensor sketching.
Instead of multiplying a random matrix on the data, the data points are sampled independently with a certain probability depending on the norm of the point.

Applications

Explicit polynomial kernels
Kernel methods are popular in machine learning as they give the algorithm designed the freedom to design a "feature space" in which to measure the similarity of their data points.
A simple kernel-based binary classifier is based on the following computation:

The function  is the kernel.

When used this way, the kernel method is called "implicit".
Sometimes it is faster to do an "explicit" kernel method, in which a pair of functions  are found, such that .
This allows the above computation to be expressed as

where the value  can be computed in advance.

The problem with this method is that the feature space can be very large.
If  is already large,  can be much larger than the number of data points and so the explicit method is inefficient.

This method was shown in 2020 to work even for high degree polynomials and radial basis function kernels.

Compressed matrix multiplication

Assume we have two large datasets, represented as matrices , and we want to find the rows  with the largest inner products .
We could compute  and simply look at all  possibilities.
However, this would take at least  time, and probably closer to  using standard matrix multiplication techniques.

The idea of Compressed Matrix Multiplication is the general identity

where  is the tensor product.
Since we can compute a (linear) approximation to  efficiently, we can sum those up to get an approximation for the complete product.

Compact multilinear pooling

Bilinear pooling is the technique of taking two input vectors,  from different sources, and using the tensor product  as the input layer to a neural network.

In the authors considered using tensor sketch to reduce the number of variables needed.

In 2017 another paper takes the FFT of the input features, before they are combined using the element-wise product.
This again corresponds to the original tensor sketch.

References

Further reading

Dimension reduction
Tensors